Don Curry  (born September 7, 1958) is an American actor and stand-up comedian. He is best known for starring as Craig's sex-crazed Uncle Elroy Jones in Next Friday and Friday After Next and for his role on the sitcom Grace Under Fire.

Early life
Curry's father is Dr. L. K. Curry, pastor emeritus of Emmanual Baptist Church in Chicago. Curry's mother Dorothy, died in 2003.

Career

In 2000, Curry portrayed Craig's sex-crazed Uncle Elroy Jones in Next Friday. He reprised his role in the 2002 follow-up Friday After Next.

Curry was featured in The Boondocks episode The Color Ruckus in which he voice acts Uncle Ruckus' Caucasian-hating father. He also hosted 2013  BET's Comic View. Curry got his first start on BET's Comic View.

Filmography

Film

Television

References

External links
 
 
 

1958 births
Living people
African-American male actors
African-American male comedians
American male comedians
21st-century American comedians
Male actors from Fort Worth, Texas
21st-century African-American people
20th-century African-American people